The Dunedin volcanic group is a recent reclassification due to common magma melt ancestry of the Dunedin Volcano,  with the overlapping alkali basaltic monogenetic volcanic field which was known in earlier literature as the Waiareka-Deborah volcanic group or Waiareka volcanic field. Importantly excluded from the group are a group of volcanics of different composition (sub-alkaline basalt to basaltic andesite) and older age (36.4 to 27.6 million years ago) near Oamaru now termed the Waiareka-Deborah volcanic field. Confusingly the older Waiareka-Deborah volcanic field overlaps the Dunedin volcanic group geographically and high quality composition studies still need to be done to properly classify many volcanics near Oamaru.

Geography
The most significant volcanic features are those that define the city and harbour of Dunedin but the multiple monogenetic basalt volcanoes alter the mainly sedimentary Otago landscape. In the case of Foulden Maar one eruptive centre provides a unique means to access the fossil record of New Zealand as of 23 million years ago when it was sub tropical forest. While the most easternmost on-land occurrence is at Lookout Bluff in north Otago there is evidence of offshore underwater centres from seismic data. Haughton Hill in the Maniototo is the most northwestern eruptive centre.

Geology
There are over 150 flows or eruptive centres known and these are mainly small volume alkaline basanites. The Dunedin volcanic group still has evidence of a magma melt hot spot centred near Portobello on the Otago Peninsula that has presumably been accumulating in the last 10 million years since active volcanism ceased, as backed up by surface helium measurements.
In this region of Otago there is a Jurassic through to Cretaceous metamorphosed belt known as the Otago Schist that formed as part of the Zealandia continent In the north of the Oligocene through to Miocene aged volcanic group the basement rocks are pumpellyite to actinolite greyschist, then lower greenshist before the upper greenschist belt from Wanaka doen to Dunedin. The southern volcanics again erupted through upper greenschist and pumpellyite to actinolite greyschist. The Otago Schist is overlain by a sedimentary sequence deposited from Late Cretaceous to Miocene time. The peak of marine transgression is marked by an Oligocene carbonate platform that represents near-total continent submergence which was followed by the late Oligocene faulting that lifted Otago above sea level.

Studies of the group were previously constrained by gaps in age mapping. A pretty comprehensive age mapping now exists and gives us ages from 25 million to approximately 9 million years ago. There are for some of the data age inconsistencies, but others appear to be very accurate. There is a general age trend with west being oldest. The oldest eruptions of the Dunedin Volcano are likely to have been near Allans Beach on the Otago Peninsula at 16.0 ± 0.4 Ma. Mount Cargill is accurate at 11 Ma before present on multiple samples and techniques. About two-thirds of the eruptions in the entire group took place in the period between 16 to 11 Ma which contains all the Dunedin Volcano eruptions as well. The youngest ages might be as recent as 8 Ma and are at Lookout Bluff, but are still regarded as provisional as corrections may be necessary.

The basaltic monogenetic volcanoes were arbitrarily separated from the Dunedin Volcano as found by subsequent detailed rock analysis. However, the Dunedin volcanic group basalts are probably derived from several subtly different isotopic reservoirs. Other long standing knowledge such as the occurrence of rhönite, a very rare mineral, with the minerals phonolite and trachyte in the Dunedin Volcano, confused matters historically until international collaboration with detailed analysis of samples from the whole group area clarified matters. The likely central vent at Port Chalmers, which is likely a large diatreme is filled now with breccia in an oval about 1.3 by 2.5 km that contains volcanic clasts of mainly phonolite but also basanite, basaltic-trachyandesite, trachyandesite, syenite, gabbro, pyroxenite, and hornblendite as well as fragments of Otago Schist and Cenozoic sedimentary rocks. Within the Dunedin Volcano area at Hoopers Inlet are nepheline syenite plutonic dykes but there are no other plutonic rocks in the group area. The Dunedin Volcano has been well studied from the 1880s since New Zealand's first school of geology was established at the University of Otago but detailed studies of north - central volcanoes such as The Crater near Middlemarch were done much later.  

Northwest of Dunedin the Yellow Hill-Summer Hills area has scoria, tuff and basanite overlying Eocene-Oligocene marine sediments. To this areas north east Ram Rock appears to be an eroded basanitic pipe associated with peridotite and pyrometamorphosed Otago Schist xenoliths.

The Swinburn area to the south side of State Highway 85 has coarse doleritic textured basaltic volcanics overlying scoria-fall deposits, which in turn overlie Eocene-Oligocene marine sediments. The basalt contains rare xenoliths of peridotite, schist and porcellanitised Cenozoic sediment. North of State Highway 85 there are thin aphanitic basanitic lavas that overlie Miocene sediments that have all been tilted and now mostly dip to the north and northeast.

In the Pigroot area at Trig L lavas overlie marine sediments and include an exotic rock of mantle peridotite and crustal gabbro xenolith-bearing phonolite as the cap of Trig L.

The northwestern area of the Kakanui Range in north Otago has Siberia Hill as the main eruptive centre with a basanite cap on top of trachybasalt covering a thin  layer of Eocene to Oligocene sediments above the Otago Schist. The Obelisk has a south end of trachybasalt and basalt at the northern end.

Just southwest of Dunedin the Saddle Hill, Jaffray Hill and Scroggs Hill volcanoes are composed of tuff and basaltic trachyandesite, phonotephrite and basanite lava emplaced through coal-bearing sediments and Cenozoic mudstone.  Basanite is dominant on Saddle Hill and phonolitic pyroclastic rock underlies lava at Scroggs Hill. An historic underground coal mine is reported to have encountered the feeder pipe at Jaffray Hill. Further to the south west are the volcanoes on the western side of Lake Waihola with at least three vents.  Olivine theralite (nepheline gabbro), clinopyroxenite and peridotite have been found there.

Relationship to other volcanoes 
New Zealand's South Island has many extinct volcanic centres with no yet fully agreed tectonic mechanism of formation. They extend in age from the Cretaceous to the Pliocene and outcrop throughout Otago, Canterbury and on the Chatham Islands. The largest single eruptive centre in the South Island is the Banks Peninsula Volcano followed by the Dunedin Volcano but the Dunedin volcanic group contains a much larger monogenetic volcanic field of related eruptives to the later.

These volcanic centres can be dormant for tens of millions of years between eruptions. This implies that the mechanism of formation may be connected to the lithosphere unlike some other intraplate volcanoes such as the Hawaii island chain, which are rooted in the asthenosphere. One mechanism for the creation of these volcanoes is the flaking off of the base of Zealandia's lower lithosphere into the asthenosphere. Zealandia has a thin lithosphere as it has been extended while rafting away from Australia. If large sections of this already thin lithosphere sank into the asthenosphere, it would be replaced with hotter rock leading to decompression melting. This theoretically could cause volcanic activity that is locked to the moving lithosphere over many millions of years.

See also
Dunedin Volcano
Banks Peninsula Volcano

Notes

References

Geography of Dunedin
Extinct volcanoes
Shield volcanoes of New Zealand
Miocene shield volcanoes
Landforms of Otago
Polygenetic shield volcanoes
Volcanoes of Otago
Volcanism of New Zealand